The Exhortation to the Military Generals was a document in Classical Chinese written by Trần Quốc Tuấn in 1284, right before the invasion of the Trần dynasty by the Yuan dynasty.

Background

Text

Original text
The original text in Classical Chinese is as follows:

余常聞之 紀信以身代死而脫高帝 由于以背受戈而蔽招王 蓣讓吞炭而復主讎 申蒯断臂而赴國難 敬德一小生也身翼太宗而得免世充之圍 杲卿一遠臣也口罵禄山而不從逆賊之計 自古忠臣義士以身死國何代無之 設使數子區區為兒女子之態 徒死牖下烏能名垂竹白 與天地相為不朽哉

汝等 世為將種不曉文義 其聞其說疑信相半 古先之事姑置勿論 今余以宋韃之事言之 王公堅何人也 其裨將阮文立又何人也 以釣魚鎖鎖斗大之城 當蒙哥堂堂百萬之鋒 使宋之生靈至今受賜 骨待兀郎何人也 其裨將赤脩思又何人也 冒瘴厲於萬里之途 獗南詔於數旬之頃 使韃之君長至今留名 況余與汝等生於擾攘之秋 長於艱難之勢 竊見偽使往來道途旁午 掉鴞烏之寸舌而陵辱朝廷 委犬羊之尺軀而倨傲宰祔 托忽必列之令而索玉帛以事無已之誅求 假雲南王之號而揫金銀以竭有限之傥庫 譬猶以肉投餒虎寧能免遺後患也哉

余常 臨餐忘食中夜撫枕 涕泗交痍心腹如搗 常以未能食肉寢皮絮肝飲血為恨也 雖 余之百身高於草野 余之千屍裹於馬革 亦願為之

汝等 久居門下掌握兵權 無衣者則衣之以衣 無食者則食之以食 官卑者則遷其爵 祿薄者則給其俸 水行給舟陸行給馬 委之以兵則生死同其所為 進之在寢則笑語同其所樂 其是 公堅之為偏裨兀郎之為副貳亦未下爾

汝等 坐視主辱曾不為憂 身當國恥曾不為愧 為邦國之將侍立夷宿而無忿心 聽太常之樂宴饗偽使而無怒色 或鬥雞以為樂或賭博以為娛 或事田園以養其家 或戀妻子以私於己 修生產之業而忘軍國之務 恣田獵之遊而怠攻守之習 或甘美酒或嗜淫聲 脱有蒙韃之寇來 雄雞之距不足以穿虜甲 賭博之術不足以施軍謀 田園之富不足以贖千金之軀 妻拏之累不足以充軍國之用 生產之多不足以購虜首 獵犬之力不足以驅賊眾 美酒不足以沈虜軍 淫聲不足以聾虜耳 當此之時我家臣主就縛甚可痛哉 不唯余之采邑被削 而汝等之俸祿亦為他人之所有 不唯余之家小被驅 而汝等之妻拏亦為他人之所虜 不唯余之祖宗社稷為他人之所踐侵 而汝等之父母墳墓亦為他人之所發掘 不唯余之今生受辱雖百世之下臭名難洗惡謚長存 而汝等之家清亦不免名為敗將矣 當此之時汝等雖欲肆其娛樂 得乎

今余明告汝等 當以措火積薪為危 當以懲羹吹虀為戒 訓練士卒習爾弓矢 使 人人逄蒙家家后羿 購必烈之頭於闕下 朽雲南之肉於杲街 不唯余之采邑永為青氈 而汝等之俸祿亦終身之受賜 不唯余之家小安床褥 而汝等之妻拏亦百年之佳老 不唯余之宗廟萬世享祀 而汝等之祖父亦春秋之血食 不唯余之今生得志 而汝等百世之下芳名不朽 不唯余之美謚永垂 而汝等之姓名亦遺芳於青史矣 當此之時汝等雖欲不為娛樂 得乎

今余歷選諸家兵法為一書名曰兵書要略 汝等 或能專習是書受余教誨是夙世之臣主也 或暴棄是書違余教誨是夙世之仇讎也

何則 蒙韃乃不共戴天之讎 汝等記恬然不以雪恥為念不以除凶為心 而又不教士卒是倒戈迎降空拳受敵 使平虜之後萬世遺羞 上有何面目立於天地覆載之間耶

故欲汝等明知余心因筆以檄云

English translation
I have often read the story of Ji Xin who replaced the Emperor Gao of Han to save him from death, of Yao Yu who took a blow in his back to save King Zhao of Chu, of Yu Rang who swallowed burning charcoal to avenge his leader, of Shin Kuai who cut off an arm to save his country, of young Jing De who rescued the Emperor Taizong of Tang besieged by Wang Shichong, and Gao Qing (顏杲卿), a subject living far from the Court, who insulted the rebel An Lushan to his face. Every century has produced heroes who have sacrificed their lives for their country. If they had remained at home to die by the fire, would their names have been inscribed on bamboo and silk to live eternally in Heaven and on the Earth?

But as descendants of warrior families, ye are not well-versed in letters; on hearing about these deeds of the past, ye may have some doubts. Let us speak of them no more. I shall tell you instead of several more recent events that have taken place during the years of the Song and Yuan dynasties.

Who was Wang Gongjian? And who was his lieutenant Ruan Wen Li? They were the ones who defended the small citadel of Diao Yu against Möngke Khan's immense army; Therefore, the Song people will be eternally grateful to them. Who was Uriyangkhadai? And who was his lieutenant Qisusi? They were the ones who drove deep into an unhealthful country in order to put down the Nanzhao bandits and they did it within the space of a few weeks; therefore, their names have remained rooted in the minds of the Mongol military chieftains.

Ye and I were born in a period of troubles and have grown up at a time when the Motherland is in danger. We have seen the enemy ambassadors haughtily traveling over our roads and wagging their owlish tongues to insult the Court; despicable as dogs and goats, they boldly humiliate our high officials. Supported by Kubilai Khan, they incessantly demand the payment of pearls, silks, gold and silver. Our wealth is limited but their cupidity is infinite. To yield to their exactions would be to feed their insatiable appetites and would set a dangerous precedent for the future.

In the face of these dangers to the Motherland, I fail to eat during the day and to sleep at night. Tears roll down my cheeks and my heart bleeds as if it were being cut to shreds. I tremble with anger because I cannot eat our enemy's flesh, lie down in his skin, chew up his liver, and drink his blood. I would gladly surrender my life a thousand times on the field of battle if I could do these things.

Ye have served in the army under my orders for a long time. When ye needed clothing, I clothed you; when ye lacked rice, I fed you; when your rank was too low, I promoted you; when your pay was insufficient, I increased it. If ye had to travel by water, I supplied you with vessels; if ye had to travel by land, I supplied you with horses. In time of war, we shared the same dangers; at the banquet table our laughter resounded in unison. Indeed, even Wang Gong Jian and Uriyangqatai did not show more solicitude for their officers than I have displayed for you.

And now, ye remain calm when your emperor is humiliated; ye remain indifferent when your country is threatened! Ye, officers, are forced to serve the barbarians and ye feel no shame! Ye hear the music played for their ambassadors and ye do not leap up in anger. No, ye amuse yourselves at the cockfights, in gambling, in the possession of your gardens and rice fields, and in the tranquility of family life. The exploitation of your personal affairs makes ye forget your duties to the State; the distractions of the fields and of the hunt make you neglect military exercises; ye are seduced by liquor and music. If the enemy comes, will your cocks' spurs be able to pierce his armor? Will the ruses ye use in your games of chance be of use in repulsing him? Will the love of your wives and children be of any use in the Army? Your money would neither suffice to buy the enemy's death, your alcohol to besot him, nor your music to deafen him. All of us, ye and I together, would then be taken prisoner. What grief! And not only would I lose my fief, but your property too would fall into enemy hands. It would not be my family alone that would be driven out, but your wives and children would also be reduced to slavery. It would not be only the graves of my ancestors that would be trampled under the invader's heel, but those of your ancestors would also be violated. I would be humiliated in this life and in a hundred others to come, and my name would be ignominiously tarnished. Your family's honor would also be sullied forever with the shame of your defeat. Tell me: Could ye then indulge yourselves in pleasures?

I say to you in all frankness: Take care as if ye were piling wood by the fire or about to imbibe a hot liquid. Exercise your soldiers in the skills of archery until they are the equals of Peng Meng and Hou Yi, those famous archers of olden times. Then we will display Kublai's head at the gates of the Imperial Palace and send the Prince of Yunnan to the gallows. After that, not only my fief will be safe forever, but your privileges too will be assured for the future. Not only my family will enjoy the comforts of life, but ye too will be able to spend your old age with your wives and children. Not only the memory of my ancestors will be venerated from generation to generation, but yours too will be worshipped in the spring and autumn of every year. Not only will I have accomplished my aspirations in this life, but your fame too will endure for a hundred centuries to come. Not only will my name be immortalized, but yours too will find a place in our nation's history. At that moment, would ye not be perfectly happy even if ye did not expect to be?

I have studied every military treatise in order to write my manual entitled "Principles of Military Strategy". If ye will make an effort to study it conscientiously, to instruct yourselves in its teachings, and to follow my directions, ye will become my true companions-in-arms. On the other hand, if ye fail to study it and ignore my advice, ye will become my enemies. Why? Because the Mongols are our mortal enemies; we cannot live under the same sky with them. If ye refuse to fight the Mongols in order to wash away the national shame, if ye do not train your soldiers to drive out these barbarians, it would be to surrender to them. If that is what ye want, your names will be dishonored forever. And when the enemy has finally been defeated, how will ye be able to hold your head high between Heaven and Earth? The purpose of this proclamation is to let you know my deepest thoughts.

External links
English translation of Proclamation of Officers
Proclamation of Officers on Wikisource

Trần dynasty texts
13th-century documents
Chinese-language literature of Vietnam